[Sic] is a jazz-fusion album released in 2006 by Austrian guitarist Alex Machacek. The album features drummer Terry Bozzio.

Reception

In a review for AllMusic, Ken Dryden wrote: "The music throughout [Sic] is quite impressive, easily eclipsing most of what passes for instrumental rock or jazz fusion. Highly recommended."

Writing for All About Jazz, John Kelman stated: "Machacek's remarkable blend of advanced composition, masterful technique, and total musicality makes [Sic], quite simply, an instant classic that transcends genre-typing, and one of the best records of the year."

After listening to the album, guitarist John McLaughlin said: "Alex Machacek's music starts where other music ends."

Track listing 
All tracks composed by Alex Machacek.

 "[sic]" – 5:43
 "Indian Girl (Meets Austrian Boy)" – 8:18
 "Miss Understanding" – 1:19
 "Yellow Pages" – 6:16
 "Djon Don" – 9:06
 "Piano" – 6:34
 "Out of Pappenheim" – 7:48
 "Austin Powers" – 6:04
 "Ballad of the Dead Dog" – 3:44

Personnel
Musicians
 Herbert Pirker – drums (tracks: 4, 6, 8, 9)
 Mario Lackner – drums (tracks: 7)
 Terry Bozzio – drums (tracks: 1, 2, 5)
 Raphael Preuschl – electric upright bass (tracks: 3, 4, 6, 8, 9)
 Alex Machacek – guitar
 Sumitra Nanjundan – vocals (track 2)
 Randy Allar – voice (track 1)

Other credits
 Souvik Dutta – executive producer
 Bob Katz – mastering
 Alex Machacek, Jörg Mayr – mixing
 Alex Machacek – producer

References 

2006 albums
Alex Machacek albums
Abstract Logix albums